Murray Hedgcock (23 February 1931 – 6 May 2021) was an Australian cricket writer and journalist. He was born in south Melbourne and grew up in various country towns in Victoria. The test cricketer Bill Woodfull was the headmaster of one of his schools. After leaving school, he worked briefly in a bank before becoming a journalist. He worked in newspapers including the Sunraysia Daily and The News (Adelaide). From 1966 until his retirement in 1991, he was posted to London. He wrote regularly for The Australian, Wisden and The Cricketer. 

He edited a collection of PG Wodehouse's cricket writing under the title Wodehouse at the Wicket (1997). Other works include Hand in hand : Watney's Mortlake world : a brief history of Watney's Brewery gleaned from the company magazine and Sport in Twickenham: 91. He lived in southwest London and held both Australian and British nationalities.

Patrick Kidd wrote in The Times that: "Lord’s will be a slightly less lovely place this summer after the sudden death on Thursday of the journalist and cricket-lover Murray Hedgcock."

References

1931 births
2021 deaths
Australian cricket writers
People from Melbourne